The Zoomie Rugby Football Club (ZRFC) is an unofficial title used by both the men's and women's rugby union teams at the United States Air Force Academy. Zoomie is slang for a cadet or graduate of the United States Air Force Academy.

History
The U.S. Air Force Academy men's rugby team began in 1968. In 1980, the Air Force began competing in collegiate rugby under USA rugby. Fit and fast described play in those early years, prompting the Eastern Rockies Rugby Union President, Terry Fleener, to coin the nickname "Zoomies"... which stuck and continues on to this day. Since that time, the Air Force men's rugby team has made 13 appearances in the national tournament, earning three national championships—in 1989, 1990 and 2003. Several players have gone on to represent the USA on the US Men's National Team, including Ben Trautwein, Matt Schmitz, Josh Dean, Mike Hobson, Brian Lemay, and Eric Duechle.

The U.S. Air Force Academy women's team was founded in 1977, shortly after the first admission of women to the academy. The women's team competed within Colorado for several years, but moved to national competition when the women's national championship competition was organized in 1991. The women's team won the first national championship that same year, and have gone on to win three more, in 1994, 2002 and 2003. Two of the Air Force women's players, Shalanda Baker and Laura McDonald, have gone on to play for the United States Women's National Team.

Results

Men
See footnote

1980	National runners up
1983	National runners up
1986	National 3rd place
1987	National runners up
1988	National 3rd place
1989	National Champions
1990	National Champions
1992	National 3rd place
1993	National runners up
1994	National 3rd place
1995	National runners up
2003	National Champions
2004	National 3rd Place

Women
See footnote 

1991	National Champions
1992   National 3rd place
1993   National runners up
1994	National Champions
1995   National 3rd place
1996   National 3rd place
1997   National 3rd place
1998   National 4th place
2002	National Champions
2003	National Champions

Notes

External links
. Rugby Magazine. Retrieved 2010-02-06.

Air Force Falcons
Rugby union teams in Colorado
Rugby clubs established in 1968
1968 establishments in Colorado